is a Japanese animation studio subsidiary of Cygames.

Establishment
In 2015, Cygames announced the creation of its own anime production division to produce anime for their gaming IP but also anime originals. A year later in 2016, Cygames announced the creation of its own anime studio called CygamesPictures to create and animate their own anime, at the same time that its anime production division now is part of the studio itself.

Works

TV series
Manaria Friends (2019)
Princess Connect! Re:Dive (2020–2022)
The Idolmaster Cinderella Girls U149 (2023)

Original net animation
Blade Runner Black Out 2022 (2017)
Uma Musume Pretty Derby: Road to the Top (2023)

References

External links
  
 

CyberAgent
Animation studios in Tokyo
Japanese animation studios
Japanese companies established in 2016
Mass media companies established in 2016